Jack David Wildermuth (born 1 September 1993) is an Australian cricketer who plays first-class cricket for Queensland. He made his List A debut for Cricket Australia XI on 5 October 2015 in the 2015–16 Matador BBQs One-Day Cup. He made his Twenty20 (T20) debut for Brisbane Heat in the 2016–17 Big Bash League season on 21 December 2016.

In May 2018, he was named in Australia's Twenty20 International (T20I) squad for the 2018 Zimbabwe Tri-Nation Series. He made his T20I debut for Australia against Zimbabwe on 6 July 2018.

Wildermuth's grandfather, Graham Bizzell, also played first-class cricket for Queensland, and his great uncle, Tom Veivers, played Test cricket for Australia.

References

External links
 

1993 births
Living people
Australian cricketers
Australia Twenty20 International cricketers
Queensland cricketers
Cricket Australia XI cricketers
Brisbane Heat cricketers
Melbourne Renegades cricketers
Cricketers from Toowoomba